James Albert is an Indian script writer and director who works in Malayalam cinema. He graduated from Fatima Mata National College, Kollam. He is probably most popular for his debut screenplay Classmates (2006).

Career
He started his career through the film Classmates (2006). His next movie was Cycle directed by Johny Antony. Mariyam Mukku was his directorial debut.

Filmography

References

External links
 

Indian male screenwriters
Living people
Malayalam screenwriters
Malayalam film directors
Year of birth missing (living people)